Bibi Gaytán (or Biby) (born Silvia Gaytán Barragán on January 27, 1972) is a Mexican singer and actress. Since she was born, she has lived in Villahermosa, Tabasco and she considers herself "Tabasqueña".

Career
She is the only female among five brothers: musician Gonzalo "Chacho" Gaytán, retired actor Alejandro Gaytán, Timbiriche's Daniel "Mano" Gaytán and Rodrigo "Ruy' Gaytán. Bibi Gaytán started her career in 1989 when she joined the musical group Timbiriche, taking the place of original band member Alix Bauer. When she was in Timbiriche, she finished the tour for the "Timbiriche 8/9" album, and later recorded and toured for the "Timbiriche 10" album.

In 1991, she was cast in the Televisa telenovela, Alcanzar Una Estrella II, co-starring Sasha Sokol, Ricky Martin, Erik Rubin, Angélica Rivera, Pedro Fernández, among other known Mexican actors, as part of a fictional musical group called Muñecos de papel. Her solo song, Tan Sólo Una Mujer written by Ricardo Arjona, hit the charts and was a success in her singing career. She later left Timbiriche in May and her place was taken by Tanya Velasco.

1992 was an important year in Bibi's career. She starred in what became the box office hit of the year, the film Mas Que Alcanzar Una Estrella as part of the "Alcanzar una estrella" saga. That same year, she got one of the leads in the soap opera, Baila Conmigo, along with singer Paulina Rubio, and Eduardo Capetillo with whom she started a romantic relationship by the end of the telenovela. In September 1992, she released her first solo album, Bibi Gaytán. That album included the singles, Y Se Marcha Diciendo Perdon, No Me Importa, Mucha Mujer Para Ti, and Rock Cafe. She also released a 1993 calendar that was a hit.

After intense promotion of her debut album in Latin America, in mid-1993, she was cast for another telenovela. One of the most popular telenovelas in television history in Mexico, Dos Mujeres, Un Camino, alongside Erik Estrada and Laura Leon. It was the first telenovela that included "grupero artists" such as Grupo Bronco and the late Selena. The telenovela lasted one year.

In 1994, Bibi released her second studio album titled Manzana Verde. The promotion of this album did not even start because Bibi was pregnant. On June 25, 1994, Bibi and Eduardo Capetillo got married in the State of Morelos in Hacienda de Chiconcuac, an estate built in the 16th century by Martín Cortés, son of Hernán Cortés and La Malinche. The wedding was televised and was a historic event in Mexican Pop Culture.

On August 17, 1994, Eduardo Capetillo Gaytán was born and later, on May 13, 1997, Ana Paula Capetillo Gaytán was born.

In 1998, both Bibi and Capetillo starred in the telenovela, Camila alongside Adamari Lopez. It was the new version of 80s hit "Viviana". This is the last telenovela where Bibi has worked as a lead protagonist.

A third child was born on November 4, 1999, Alejandra Capetillo Gaytán.

In the 2000s, we saw Bibi do television ads, she even starred in 5 episodes of En Nombre del Amor, she was a guest judge in Bailando por un sueño. In 2011, Eduardo and Bibi moved from Televisa to Television Azteca. Bibi did La Academia as a co-host and later Mexico Baila as a dance judge.

The Capetillo Gaytán family kept growing, and on June 20, 2014, twin brothers Manuel Capetillo Gaytán and Daniel Capetillo Gaytán were born.

Bibi is active on social media, with official Instagram and Twitter accounts.

Discography 
 1992: Bibi Gaytan
 1994: Manzana verde

Appearances 
 1990: Timbiriche 10 ("Como Te Dire")
 1991: Muñecos de Papel – appears on the cover, but her vocals were not recorded due to differences with the record label
 1991: Alcanzar una estrella II – Various Artists ("Tan Solo Una Mujer", "Solo Quiero Que Me Vuelvas a Querer", "Fijate En Mi" – Bibi Gaytán, "No Quiero Dejar De Brillar" – Muñecos de Papel)
 1992: Baila conmigo – Various Artists ("Olvidame", "El Primer Adios")
 1992: Más que alcanzar una estrella – Various Artists ("Sha La La y Apertura" – Bibi Gaytán, Ricky Martin, Alex Ibarra, Lorena Rojas)
 1999: Ellas Cantan a Cri Cri – Various Artists ("Di Por Que")
 2007: Un Vaquero en la ciudad – Eduardo Capetillo ("Una de Vaqueros" – trio con Joan Sebastian y Bibi Gaytán, "Si no es ahora" – duo con Bibi Gaytán)

Filmography

Film

Television

Awards and nominations

Premios TVyNovelas

References

External links 
– Official Instagram Account
Official My Space Music Page of Bibi Gaytán

1972 births
Living people
Mexican telenovela actresses
Mexican women singers
Actresses from Chiapas
Singers from Chiapas
20th-century Mexican actresses
21st-century Mexican actresses
Timbiriche members
People from Tapachula